Diplogaster is a genus of nematodes belonging to the family Diplogastridae.

The species of this genus are found in Europe, Africa and Northern America.

Species:

Diplogaster australis 
Diplogaster gagarini 
Diplogaster intermedia 
Diplogaster labiata 
Diplogaster macrura 
Diplogaster pararmatus 
Diplogaster parasitica 
Diplogaster parvus 
Diplogaster pterygatus 
Diplogaster rivalis 
Diplogaster rivalis 
Diplogaster spirifer

References

Nematodes